WEGR is a classic rock FM radio station in Memphis, Tennessee. It is owned by iHeartMedia, Inc. and serves the Memphis metropolitan area, including sections of Tennessee, Arkansas, Missouri and Mississippi.  WEGR broadcasts at 102.7 MHz and on the air it calls itself Rock 103.  The station's studios are located in Southeast Memphis, and the transmitter site is in Bartlett, Tennessee.  WEGR broadcasts at 100,000 watts.

WEGR broadcasts in the HD Radio format.

History
The station first signed on in March 1967 as WREC-FM, sister to WREC 600 AM.  In December 1975, the station went to an automated Country music format with the call letters WZXR.  On September 25, 1977, the station switched to AOR (Album Oriented Rock).  Except for a brief flirtation with Top 40 in 1985 and 1986, the station has played some form of rock ever since.

Known as "Rock 103," WEGR has been consistently programmed with a classic rock format for more than 40 years. Its mascot is a walrus , which has seen numerous incarnations. For a brief period, the station was promoted as "The Eagle," in an attempt to create a brand from the call sign.

For many years, WEGR's studio was located at historic 203 Beale Street. It was moved in 2003 to a facility shared by other area iHeartMedia broadcast stations.

September 5, 2019, nationally syndicated John Clay Wolfe Show joins WEGR on Saturday mornings.

Previous logo
 (WEGR's logo under previous "Rock 102.7" branding)

References

External links
Rock 103 Official website

EGR
Classic rock radio stations in the United States
IHeartMedia radio stations
1967 establishments in Tennessee
Radio stations established in 1967